The following elections occurred in the year 1824.

 1824 French legislative election

North America

United States
 A. B. plot
 1824 New York gubernatorial election
 1824 United States House of Representatives elections
 1824 United States presidential election

See also
 :Category:1824 elections

1824
Elections